The eighth season of The Voice begins airing on 19 May 2019. Dubbed as the "All Stars" season, this season features a number of artists who had previously appeared on previous seasons of the show, as well as from The X Factor Australia and Australia's Got Talent. The coaching line-up consisted of returning coaches Delta Goodrem, Boy George, and Kelly Rowland, and new addition Guy Sebastian, replacing Joe Jonas. 

Diana Rouvas from Team George won the competition on 7 July 2019, marking the first All-Star contestant to win, as well as Boy George's first and only victory as a coach.

Coaches and hosts

On 17 October 2018, the series was renewed for an eighth season and it was announced that Goodrem, George, and Rowland would all return, along with host Sonia Kruger. On 14 November 2018, Nine announced Guy Sebastian would replace Jonas as the fourth judge for the eighth season.

Teams
Color key

Blind auditions
Colour key

Episode 1 (19 May)

Episode 2 (20 May),

Episode 3 (21 May)

Episode 4 (26 May)

Episode 5 (27 May)

Episode 6 (28 May)

Episode 7 (2 June)

Episode 8 (3 June) 

Jess Glynne guest auditioned with her song "I'll Be There" and turned all chairs.

Episode 9 (4 June)

Episode 10 (9 June)

The Knockouts 
The Knockout rounds started on 10 June. The coaches can save two losing artists from any team, including their own. Contestants who win their battle or are saved will advance to the Battle rounds.

Color key:

Episode 11 (10 June)

Kelly first used her save on Luke; when Tannah lost her knockout and no saves were used Kelly suggested she became a duo with Luke. Both artists agreed.

Episode 12 (11 June)

Episode 13 (16 June)

Denzel was originally given "This is America", but Kelly opted to give him an original song.

Battle rounds 
The Battle rounds started on 17 June. After all of their team's battles were done, the coaches chose one of their losing artists as a wildcard. The top 16 contestants then moved on to the Finals. 

Color key:

Episode 14 (17 June)

Episode 15 (18 June)

The Finals

Episodes 16 & 17 (24 & 25 June)

The first week of the Finals was pre-taped and first broadcast on 24 & 25 June 2019. Over the two episodes, all artists of the Top 16 take on a solo performance. Team George & Team Kelly perform on the first night and Team Delta & Team Guy perform on the second night. At the end of each episode, the coaches choose three out of their four artists to advance to the Live Top 12.

Episode 18 (1 July)

Semi-final (2 July)
With the eliminations of Jack Vidgen, Chynna Taylor, and Mitch Paulsen, Guy Sebastian had no more contestants left on his team, making this the fourth season in the Australian version of the franchise where a coach did not have a contestant in the Grand Finale. It's also the second season where Delta Goodrem managed to bring two artists to the Grand Finale.

Grand Finale
The Grand Finale was first broadcast on 7 July 2019.

With Diana Rouvas's win, this marks the first time in the Australian history that an artist from a past season won the competition. And this is the first time since the third season in which a male coach won the show.

Live Shows Elimination Charts

Overall
Artist's info

Result details

Team
Result details

Contestants who appeared on previous season or TV shows
 Luke Zancanaro and Tannah Zancanaro auditioned together as a duo on The X Factor in season seven, but didn't make the Live Shows. They were mentored by Guy Sebastian.
 Prinnie Stevens competed on the first season, where she was mentored by Joel Madden and reached top 12. She also co-hosted The Voice Kids with Darren McMullen in 2014, and appeared on the second season of Australian Idol where she was a semi-finalist.
 Chynna Taylor appeared on the eighth season of The X Factor in 2016, finishing in 6th place. She was mentored by Guy Sebastian.
 Amanuael Visser competed on the 2012 revival of Young Talent Time where he was a grand-finalist.
 Diana Rouvas competed on the show's first season, where she was mentored by Keith Urban and reached top 8.
 Lara Dabbagh auditioned in the previous season, but didn't turn a chair.
 Madi Krstevski competed in the previous season, mentored by Kelly Rowland and later Joe Jonas, only to end up eliminated in the battle rounds.
 Lee Harding competed on the third season of Australian Idol, where he was eliminated in third place.
 Jesse Teinaki auditioned on the sixth season of The X Factor in 2014, but didn't make the Live Shows.
 The Koi Boys competed on the show's fifth season, where they were mentored by Jessie J and were eliminated in the Super Battle Rounds.
 Ellen Reed competed on the show's fifth season, where she was mentored by Jessie J, reached the grand final and ended up in fourth place.
 Molly Waters competed on season 1 of The Voice Kids Australia in 2014, where she was mentored by Mel B and was eliminated in the Battle Rounds.
 Aliqua Mao appeared on the seventh season of Australian Idol where she was a semi-finalist.
 Vendulka Wichta auditioned on The X Factor in  season four and season five, but didn't make the Live Shows in both seasons.
 Carlos C Major competed on the show's third season, where he was mentored by Ricky Martin and reached the top 16. He also appeared on the second season of Australian Idol where he was a semi-finalist, under the name Carlos Velazquez.
Jack Vidgen was the winner of the fifth season of Australia's Got Talent.
 Kim Sheehy competed on the show's fifth season, where she was mentored by Delta Goodrem and reached top 12. She also auditioned for the second season, but failed to turn a chair.
Nathan Foley was an original member of Hi-5.
Jazmin Varlet auditioned for the show's sixth season, but didn't turn a chair.
Sheldon Riley was on the eighth season of The X Factor, as a member of Time and Place, who were eliminated on the first live show, and was on the show's previous season where he placed 3rd. He was mentored by Boy George.
 Matt Garwood competed on the show's third season, where he was mentored by Ricky Martin. He was eliminated in the Showdowns.
 Rebecca Selley auditioned for the show's season 1 with no chair turned and she competed in season 1 of Australian Idol and got eliminated in the wild cards for the semi-finals, when she was Rebecca Tapia at the time.
 Joey Dee was a member of Young Talent Time from 1987-88.

Ratings
 Colour key:
  – Highest rating during the season
  – Lowest rating during the season

References

8
2019 Australian television seasons